The Talk on Corners Tour is the second concert tour by Irish band, The Corrs. Beginning November 1997, the tour supported the band's second studio album, Talk on Corners. To date, it is their longest tour, with over 150 dates in Europe, Australasia, Asia and North America. The tour began with the band performing in theatres and nightclubs and progressed to arenas and amphitheaters; along with a mix of music festival appearances.

Background
After promoting their second studio album, the band began tour rehearsals in October 1997 at The Factory Studios in Dublin. After rehearsals, the band promoted the tour on various radio stations throughout Europe. In February 1998 the band began their tour of Australia and New Zealand, while in New Zealand the band shot the video for "What Can I Do?". In March 1998, the band began their tour of the United Kingdom, where the performed at the Royal Albert Hall on Saint Patrick's Day with Mick Fleetwood joining the band for "Dreams", "Haste to the Wedding" and "Toss the Feathers". The show helped push "Dreams" to the top spot on British charts. It Also propelled their success to become the 2nd biggest band from Ireland behind U2.

Once breaking UK music scene, the band set out to follow the success in the US, where the tours in October 1998. During their stay in Chicago, the band shot the video for "So Young". In December, the band set of on a large UK/European tour and selling out 5 night at Wembley Arena, and selling out more than half of the other venues on the tour. In March 1999, the band toured North America with The Rolling Stones as part of their No Security Tour. In July 1999, the band set off on a summer festival tour as they did the previous July (1998). But on 17 July 1999 the band did the biggest concert to date, in front of a home crowd of 45,000 people at Lansdowne Road.

Opening acts
Dakota Moon (3–22 December 1998)
Picturehouse (14 January–1 February 1999)
Babel Fish (3–8 February 1999)
Brian Kennedy (20–26 February 1999)
An Pierlé (Amsterdam)
Catie Curtis (Alexandria, Chicago, West Hollywood and Solana Beach)

Setlist
The following setlist is obtained from the 5 June 1998 concert at the Portsmouth Guildhall in Portsmouth, England. It does not represent all concerts during the tour.
"Instrumental Sequence"
"When He's Not Around"
"No Good for Me"
"Love to Love You"
"Instrumental Sequence" (contains elements of "(Lough) Erin Shore")
"Forgiven, Not Forgotten"
"Joy of Life"
"Intimacy"
"What Can I Do?"
"The Right Time"
"Queen of Hollywood"
"Dreams"
"Instrumental Sequence" (contains elements of "Haste to the Wedding")
"Runaway"
"Only When I Sleep"
"Hopelessly Addicted"
"I Never Loved You Anyway"
Encore
"So Young"
"Toss the Feathers"

Tour dates

Festivals and other miscellaneous performances

Concierto Básico 40
Fleadh Festival
Derby Day Picnic
Guinness Fleadh Music Festival
Ohne Filter
Storsjöyran
Midtfyns Festival
Party in the Park
Balinger Open Air
Doctor Music Festival
Montreux Jazz Festival
Axion Beach Rock
Gurtenfestival
Nuits de Fourvière
Sziget Festival
Radio 1 Roadshow
Sopot International Song Festival
XVI Commonwealth Games Closing Ceremony
City in the Park
Glastonbury Festival
Xacobeo '99
Stadsfesten Skellefteå
Solidays

Cancellations and rescheduled shows

Personnel

Band
Andrea Corr (lead vocals, tin whistle)
Sharon Corr (violin, keyboards, vocals)
Caroline Corr (drums, bodhran, piano, vocals)
Jim Corr (guitars, keyboards, vocals)
Keith Duffy (bass)
Anthony Drennan (lead guitar)
Conor Brady (lead guitar) (replaced Anto during the Genesis tour; 1997–1998)

Management & Agents
John Hughes (manager)
Emma Hill (management assistant)
John Giddings at Solo ITG (international agent)
Barry Gaster (Irish agent)

The Crew
Henry McGroggan (tour manager)
Aiden Lee (production manager)
Liam McCarthy (lighting designer)
Max Bisgrove (sound engineer)
Paul 'Mini' Moore (monitor engineer)
Declan Hogan (drum technician)
John Parsons (guitar technician)
Oisin Murray (midi technician)
Jay Mascrey (makeup)

References

1997 concert tours
1998 concert tours
1999 concert tours
The Corrs concert tours